Wiswall is a surname. Notable people with the surname include:

Frank L. Wiswall (1895–1972), American lawyer, horse-racing executive and politician
Ichabod Wiswall (1637–1700), Congregationalist minister in British America
Peleg Wiswall (1762–1836), Canadian lawyer, judge and politician
Thomas Wiswall (1601–1683), settler of British America